South Hills Village is a two-level shopping mall located in the Pittsburgh suburbs of Bethel Park and Upper St. Clair, Pennsylvania, United States.

History

The mall was originally developed in the mid-1960s by the Oxford Development Co. as the first shopping complex in Greater Pittsburgh to be built as a fully enclosed structure. The two-level complex is currently owned by Simon Property Group, who acquired it in 1997. It is anchored by Macy's, which opened in 2005 (formerly Horne's and Lazarus), Dick’s Sporting Goods, which opened in 2012 (occupies the top 2 floors) and Target (occupies the first floor) which opened in 2013. Target and Dick’s Sporting Goods were formerly Kaufmann's, Gimbels, and Boscov's). The mall features over 134 specialty stores. The mall also houses a food court and several professional offices. South Hills Village was the largest in Greater Pittsburgh until the Monroeville Mall, also built by the Oxford Development Company, opened in 1969.

Located across the street from Macy's is the South Hills Village light rail station. This terminal opened for revenue service in July 1985.

Businesses located just outside the mall include Eat 'N Park, AMC Classic South Hills Village 10 (opened as Carmike 10 Theater), KeyBank (originally First Niagara Bank), and a Barnes & Noble Bookstore (This appears to be part of the mall, but is only accessible from outside.) Across from the mall is DSW( Designer Shoe Warehouse) Ulta Beauty, and  Macy’s Furniture Gallery.

In 2014, plans were announced to redesign/modernize the mall. This included a new food court, more stores, and general additions to the building, such as escalators to replace the existing stairwells on each side of the mall. The remodel was finished in 2016.

On May 31, 2018, it was announced that Sears would be closing in June 2018 as part of a plan to close 72 stores nationwide. It ended up closing on September 2, 2018.

In September 2018, it was announced that Life Time Fitness will be opening in the former Sears location.

In May 2019, it was announced that the mall would be receiving a $50M upgrade. Upgrades include Life Time Fitness constructing a new building in the former Sears Auto Center location, the current former Sears building being demolished for new spaces, and the current food court getting an addition as well. As of now, the project to open Life Time Fitness has been abandoned.

On August 30, 2022, Von Maur announced they would be building their first Pennsylvania store at the mall, slated to open in 2024.

2010s Redevelopment

The vacant three-story Boscov's store (formerly Kaufmann's and Gimbels) has been converted for use by Target and Dick's Sporting Goods. This allowed Target to enter Pittsburgh's South Hills market where limited land for new development had precluded a new store. It also allowed Dick's Sporting Goods to open a much larger store to replace the small location formerly on the mall periphery. Target operates on an expanded first level of the space with Dick's Sporting Goods taking the second and third floors, though the third floor is only accessible from within the Dick's Sporting Goods store. Dick's Sporting Goods had its grand opening October 17, 2012 and Target opened March 6, 2013.

References

Shopping malls in Metro Pittsburgh
Simon Property Group
Shopping malls established in 1965